Deurne en Liessel is a former municipality in the Dutch province of North Brabant. It contained the villages of Deurne and Liessel.

Deurne en Liessel merged in 1926 with the municipality of Vlierden, to form the new municipality of "Deurne".

The spoken language is Peellands (an East Brabantian dialect, which is very similar to colloquial Dutch).

References

Former municipalities of North Brabant
Deurne, Netherlands